Thomas Whitelock Kempthorne (c.1834–3 November 1915) was a New Zealand manufacturing chemist and businessman who co-founded Kempthorne Prosser in 1870 in Dunedin. He was born in Cornwall, England c.1834.

See also
Kempthorne Prosser

References

1830s births
1915 deaths
New Zealand businesspeople
New Zealand chemists
British emigrants to New Zealand
New Zealand people of Cornish descent
English emigrants to New Zealand